The 1938 state election in Queensland, Australia was held on 2 April 1938.

Since the previous election, the Country and Progressive National Party (CPNP) had split into the state branches of the United Australia Party and the Country Party. Seats won by the CPNP in 1935 are listed as held by whichever successor party the MP joined.

By-elections

 On 14 December 1935, Jack Duggan (Labor) was elected to succeed Evan Llewelyn (Labor), who had resigned on 28 November, as the member for Toowoomba.
 On 4 April 1936, Johnno Mann (Labor) was elected to succeed Robert Funnell (Labor), who had died on 3 January, as the member for Brisbane.
 On 4 April 1936, David Daniel (Country) was elected to succeed Owen Daniel (Country), who had died on 5 January, as the member for Keppel.
 On 20 June 1936, Ernest Riordan (Labor) was elected to succeed Charles Collins (Labor), who had died on 28 March, as the member for Bowen.
 On 27 February 1937, William Demaine (Labor) was elected to succeed James Stopford (Labor), who had died on 30 November 1936, as the member for Maryborough.

Retiring Members

Labor
William Copley MLA (Bulimba)
William Demaine MLA (Maryborough)

Country
Roy Bell MLA (Stanley)

United Australia
James Maxwell MLA (Toowong)

Candidates
Sitting members at the time of the election are shown in bold text.

See also
 1938 Queensland state election
 Members of the Queensland Legislative Assembly, 1935–1938
 Members of the Queensland Legislative Assembly, 1938–1941
 List of political parties in Australia

References
 

Candidates for Queensland state elections